is a city in Osaka Prefecture, Japan. , the city had an estimated population of 73,767 in 34920 households and a population density of 5400 persons per km².

Geography
Izumiōtsu is located in the southern part of Osaka Prefecture, with Osaka Bay to the northwest. The terrain is almost flat throughout the city, and the entire city is an urbanized area. The city is about 5.4 kilometers east-west and 5.5 kilometers north-south. About 4.8 square kilometers is reclaimed land along the coast.

Neighboring municipalities
Osaka Prefecture
Takaishi
Izumi
Tadaoka

Climate
Izumiōtsu has a Humid subtropical climate (Köppen Cfa) characterized by warm summers and cool winters with light to no snowfall. The average annual temperature in Izumiōtsu is 14.7 °C. The average annual rainfall is 1475 mm with September as the wettest month. The temperatures are highest on average in August, at around 26.7 °C, and lowest in January, at around 3.4 °C.

Demographics
Per Japanese census data, the population of Izumiōtsu had been on the rise until the early 2000s, but has been on the decline since 2005.

History
The area of the modern city of Izumiōtsu was within ancient Izumi Province, and was the site of the port for the provincial capital of the province. During the Yayoi period it was a stronghold of the Mononobe clan and the place name of "Ōtsu" appears in the Nara period Nihon Shoki, the Heian period Sarashina Nikki and other works. In the Edo Period, the area was controlled by Hakata Domain or as tenryō territory of the Tokugawa shogunate administered by Kishiwada Domain. The village of Ōtsu was established within Izumi District with the creation of the modern municipalities system on April 1, 1889. On April 1, 1896 the area became part of Senboku District, Osaka. Ōtsu was promoted to town status on April 1, 1915 and to city status on April 1, 1942. To avoid confusion with the city of Ōtsu, Shiga, the city name was chosen to be "Izumiōtsu".

Government
Izumiōtsu has a mayor-council form of government with a directly elected mayor and a unicameral city council of 16 members. Izumiōtsu collectively with the city of Takaishi and the town of Tadaoka contributes two members to the Osaka Prefectural Assembly. In terms of national politics, the city is part of Osaka 18th district of the lower house of the Diet of Japan.

Economy
The textile industry has been important to Izumiōtsu since the Edo period, and the city still commands more than 90% of the domestic cotton blanket market. The port was also modernized in the early 20th century and occupies a part of the Sakai Senboku coastal industrial area. Sumitomo Rubber Industries, a major producer of automobile tires, is also a major employer.

Education
Izumiōtsu has eight public elementary schools and three public middle schools operated by the city government and one public high school operated by the Osaka Prefectural Department of Education. The city previously had a North Korean school, Senshu Korean Elementary School (泉州朝鮮初級学校).

Transportation

Railway
 Nankai Electric Railway -   Nankai Main Line
  -  -

Highway
  Bayshore Route

Sister cities
 Geelong, Australia, friendship city from April 28, 1992
 Gwangyang, South Jeolla South Korea, friendship city from May 29, 2008

Local attractions
Ikegami-Sone site, National Historic Site

Notable people from Izumiōtsu
 Kōki Aoyagi, Japanese professional baseball player (outfielder, Yokohama DeNA BayStars, Nippon Professional Baseball – Central League)
 Mariko Gotō, Japanese singer, lyricist, composer and actress
 Mizuho Katayama (Real Name: Kim Mijinsu, Hangul: 김미진수), Zainichi Korean synchronized swimming coach
 Hiromi Kawata, Japanese free announcer
 Sou Nishimura, Japanese mangaka
 Mitsuki Sumoto, Japanese figure skater
 Takashi Tachibana, Japanese social activist, journalist, accountant and politician

References

External links

 

Cities in Osaka Prefecture
Populated coastal places in Japan
Izumiōtsu